Bolshaya Vishera is a rural locality (a village) in Malovishersky District, Novgorod Oblast, Russia.

References 

Rural localities in Novgorod Oblast